Thomas Osborne Davis may refer to:

Thomas Osborne Davis (Canadian politician) (1856–1917), Saskatchewan parliamentarian
Thomas Davis (Young Irelander) (1814–1845), Young Ireland writer and politician

See also
Thomas Davis (disambiguation)